Sarp is a village in the Kemalpaşa District, Artvin Province, Turkey. Its population is 177 (2021). Situated on the Black Sea coast, it is a border crossing point to Sarpi in Georgia.

References

Villages in Kemalpaşa District
Laz settlements in Turkey
Georgia (country)–Turkey border crossings